Raja Pakar Assembly constituency is an assembly constituency in Vaishali district in the Indian state of Bihar. It is reserved for scheduled castes.

Overview
As per Delimitation of Parliamentary and Assembly constituencies Order, 2008, No. 127 Raja Pakar Assembly constituency is composed of the following: Raja Pakar, Desri and Sahdei Buzurg community development blocks.

Raja Pakar Assembly constituency (SC) is part of No. 21 Hajipur (Lok Sabha constituency) (SC).

Members of Legislative Assembly

Election results

2020 

	

In the 2010 state assembly elections, Sanjay Kumar of JD(U) won the newly created Raja Pakar assembly seat defeating his nearest rival Gaurishankar Paswan of LJP. In 2015 Shivchandr Ram of Rashtriya Janata Dal emerged victorious in the assembly elections from this reserved seat.

References

External links
 

Assembly constituencies of Bihar
Politics of Vaishali district